Nottawa may refer to the following places:

In Canada:
 Nottawa, Ontario

In the United States:
 Nottawa Township, Isabella County, Michigan
 Nottawa Township, St. Joseph County, Michigan
 Nottawa Creek, also known as Nottawa River, in Michigan

See also 
 Nottawaseppi Huron Band of Potawatomi, (originally known as "Nottawa-seepe") namesake of township in St. Joseph County, Michigan
 Nottaway River, in Quebec, Canada
 Nottoway (disambiguation)